Kishi may refer to:

People
 Kishi (biblical figure)
, Japanese actress and AV Idol
, Japanese culinary critic
, Japanese gravure idol, actress, and variety tarento
, Japanese trampoline gymnast
, Japanese baseball player
, Japanese actress and writer
, Japanese politician
, Japanese composer, conductor and violinist
 Kichimatsu Kishi (1871–1956), Japanese–American agriculturalist
, Japanese film critic and screenwriter
, Japanese politician and prime minister
, Japanese politician, grandson of Nobusuke Kishi
, Japanese football player and manager
, Japanese baseball player
 Yoshito Kishi (1937–2023), Japanese-American chemist
, Japanese singer and actor
, Japanese author
, Japanese singer, actor and television personality
, Japanese actor and voice actor

Places
 Kishi, Hormozgan, Iran
 Kisi, Nigeria
 Kishi Station (disambiguation), several places

Other uses
 Kishi (folklore), a two-faced demon in Angolan folklore

See also

Kish (disambiguation)

Japanese-language surnames